Claudiano Alves dos Santos (born 7 October 1981 in Serra Negra, São Paulo), better known as Diano, is a retired Brazilian footballer who played as a defender. His last known club was Sriwijaya FC in the Indonesia Super League.

Career
Diano started his career at Guaçuano before being signed by Belasitsa Petrich on 19 July 2005. Diano joined Levski Sofia on loan for the second half of the 2006–07 season before leaving for Olimpik Baku in 2008. Diano spent two seasons with Olimpik Baku before joining Sriwijaya FC in the Indonesia Super League.

Career statistics

Honours

Club
Sriwijaya FC
 Piala Indonesia: 2010
 Indonesian Community Shield: 2010
 Indonesian Inter Island Cup: 2010

References

External links
 Brazilian FA Database
 Profile at Belasitsa Petrich
 Profile at Liga Indonesia

1981 births
Living people
Footballers from São Paulo (state)
Association football defenders
Brazilian footballers
Brazilian expatriate footballers
Brazilian expatriate sportspeople in Azerbaijan
Brazilian expatriate sportspeople in Bulgaria
Brazilian expatriate sportspeople in Indonesia
Expatriate footballers in Azerbaijan
Expatriate footballers in Bulgaria
Expatriate footballers in Indonesia
First Professional Football League (Bulgaria) players
PFC Levski Sofia players
Liga 1 (Indonesia) players
Sriwijaya F.C. players
Azerbaijan Premier League players
AZAL PFK players